Nezam al-Din Ahmad Gilani (1585 – after 1662), also known by his honorific title of Hakim al-Molk, was an Iranian philosopher and physician from Gilan, who served the Qutb Shahi rulers in the Indian region of Deccan.

Nezam al-Din Ahmad was born in 1585 to a family native to Gilan, a region and Safavid province on the Caspian coast of northern Iran. The family were from the village of Moridan, close to the village of Malat, which had originally served as the headquarters of the Kar-Kiya dynasty (1370s–1592) of Biya-pish (eastern Gilan). Nezam al-Din Ahmad was the son of Ali, a physician who was the son of a certain Hasan. Nezam al-Din Ahmad may have been the great-grandson of a namesake astrologer and geomancer from Gilan, who went to the city of Herat, then ruled by the Timurid Sultan Husayn Bayqara. Even during his stay in the Deccan, Nezam al-Din Ahmad was still in close contacts with people from his village as other Gilani scholars in the Deccan.

References

Sources 
 

17th-century Iranian philosophers
17th-century writers of Safavid Iran
People from Gilan Province
Qutb Shahi dynasty
Deccan sultanates
Iranian emigrants to India